The wet-bulb temperature (WBT) is the temperature read by a thermometer covered in water-soaked (water at ambient temperature) cloth (a wet-bulb thermometer) over which air is passed. At 100% relative humidity, the wet-bulb temperature is equal to the air temperature (dry-bulb temperature); at lower humidity the wet-bulb temperature is lower than dry-bulb temperature because of evaporative cooling.

The wet-bulb temperature is defined as the temperature of a parcel of air cooled to saturation (100% relative humidity) by the evaporation of water into it, with the latent heat supplied by the parcel. A wet-bulb thermometer indicates a temperature close to the true (thermodynamic) wet-bulb temperature. The wet-bulb temperature is the lowest temperature that can be reached under current ambient conditions by the evaporation of water only.

Intuition
If a thermometer is wrapped in a water-moistened cloth, it will behave differently. The drier and less humid the air is, the faster the water will evaporate.  The faster water evaporates, the lower the thermometer's temperature will be relative to air temperature.

Water can evaporate only if the air around it can absorb more water. This is measured by comparing how much water is in the air to the maximum that could be in the air—the relative humidity. 0% means the air is completely dry, and 100% means the air contains all the water it can hold in the present circumstances and it cannot absorb any more water (from any source).

This is part of the cause of apparent temperature in humans. The drier the air, the more moisture it can take up beyond what is already in it, and the easier it is for extra water to evaporate. The result is that sweat evaporates more quickly in drier air, cooling down the skin faster. If the relative humidity is 100%, no water can evaporate, and cooling by sweating or evaporation is not possible.

When relative humidity is 100%, a wet-bulb thermometer can also no longer be cooled by evaporation, so it will read the same as an unwrapped thermometer.

General

The wet-bulb temperature is the lowest temperature that may be achieved by evaporative cooling of a water-wetted, ventilated surface.

By contrast, the dew point is the temperature to which the ambient air must be cooled to reach 100% relative humidity assuming there is no further evaporation into the air; it is the temperature where condensation (dew) and clouds would form.

For a parcel of air that is less than saturated (i.e., air with less than 100 percent relative humidity), the wet-bulb temperature is lower than the dry-bulb temperature, but higher than the dew point temperature. The lower the relative humidity (the drier the air), the greater the gaps between each pair of these three temperatures. Conversely, when the relative humidity rises to 100%, the three figures coincide.

For air at a known pressure and dry-bulb temperature, the thermodynamic wet-bulb temperature corresponds to unique values of the relative humidity and the dew point temperature. It therefore may be used for the practical determination of these values. The relationships between these values are illustrated in a psychrometric chart.

Lower wet-bulb temperatures that correspond with drier air in summer can translate to energy savings in air-conditioned buildings due to:
Reduced dehumidification load for ventilation air
Increased efficiency of cooling towers
increased efficiency of evaporative coolers

Thermodynamic wet-bulb temperature 
The thermodynamic wet-bulb temperature is the temperature a volume of air would have if cooled adiabatically to saturation by evaporation of water into it, all latent heat being supplied by the volume of air.

The temperature of an air sample that has passed over a large surface of liquid water in an insulated channel is the thermodynamic wet-bulb temperature—the air has become saturated by passing through a constant-pressure, ideal, adiabatic saturation chamber.

Meteorologists and others may use the term "isobaric wet-bulb temperature" to refer to the "thermodynamic wet-bulb temperature".  It is also called the "adiabatic saturation temperature", though meteorologists also use "adiabatic saturation temperature" to mean "temperature at the saturation level", i.e. the temperature the parcel would achieve if it expanded adiabatically until saturated.

The thermodynamic wet-bulb temperature is a thermodynamic property of a mixture of air and water vapor. The value indicated by a simple wet-bulb thermometer often provides an adequate approximation of the thermodynamic wet-bulb temperature.

For an accurate wet-bulb thermometer, "the wet-bulb temperature and the adiabatic saturation temperature are approximately equal for air-water vapor mixtures at atmospheric temperature and pressure. This is not necessarily true at temperatures and pressures that deviate significantly from ordinary atmospheric conditions, or for other gas–vapor mixtures."

Temperature reading of wet-bulb thermometer

Wet-bulb temperature is measured using a thermometer that has its bulb wrapped in cloth—called a sock—that is kept wet with distilled water via wicking action. Such an instrument is called a wet-bulb thermometer.  A widely used device for measuring wet- and dry-bulb temperature is a sling psychrometer, which consists of a pair of mercury bulb thermometers, one with a wet "sock" to measure the wet-bulb temperature and the other with the bulb exposed and dry for the dry-bulb temperature.  The thermometers are attached to a swivelling handle, which allows them to be whirled around so that water evaporates from the sock and cools the wet bulb until it reaches thermal equilibrium.

An actual wet-bulb thermometer reads a temperature that is slightly different from the thermodynamic wet-bulb temperature, but they are very close in value. This is due to a coincidence: for a water-air system the psychrometric ratio (see below) happens to be close to 1, although for systems other than air and water they might not be close.

To understand why this is so, first consider the calculation of the thermodynamic wet-bulb temperature.

Experiment 1

In this case, a stream of unsaturated air is cooled. The heat from cooling that air is used to evaporate some water which increases the humidity of the air. At some point the air becomes saturated with water vapor (and has cooled to the thermodynamic wet-bulb temperature). In this case we can write the following balance of energy per mass of dry air:

  saturated water content of the air (kgH2O/kgdry air)
  initial water content of the air (same unit as above)
  latent heat of water (J/kgH2O)
  initial air temperature (K)
  saturated air temperature (K)
  specific heat of air (J/kg·K)

Experiment 2

For the case of the wet-bulb thermometer, imagine a drop of water with unsaturated air blowing over it. As long as the vapor pressure of water in the drop (function of its temperature) is greater than the partial pressure of water vapor in the air stream, evaporation will take place. Initially, the heat required for the evaporation will come from the drop itself since the fastest moving water molecules are most likely to escape the surface of the drop, so the remaining water molecules will have a lower average speed and therefore a lower temperature.

Instead, as the drop starts cooling, it is now colder than the air, so convective heat transfer begins to occur from the air to the drop. Furthermore, the evaporation rate depends on the difference of concentration of water vapor between the drop-stream interface and the distant stream (i.e. the "original" stream, unaffected by the drop), and on a convective mass transfer coefficient, which is a function of the components of the mixture (i.e. water and air).

After a certain period, an equilibrium is reached: the drop has cooled to a point where the rate of heat carried away in evaporation is equal to the heat gain through convection. At this point, the following balance of energy per interface area is true:

  water content of interface at equilibrium (kgH2O/kgdry air) (note that the air in this region is and has always been saturated)
  water content of the distant air (same unit as above)
  mass transfer coefficient (kg/m2⋅s)
  air temperature at distance (K)
  water drop temperature at equilibrium (K)
  convective heat transfer coefficient (W/m2·K)

Note that:
  is the driving force for mass transfer (constantly equal to  throughout the entire experiment)
  is the driving force for heat transfer (when  reaches , the equilibrium is reached)

Let us rearrange that equation into:

Now let's go back to our original "thermodynamic wet-bulb" experiment, Experiment 1.

Rearranging:

If  then the temperature of the drop in Experiment 2 is the same as the wet-bulb temperature in Experiment 1. Due to a coincidence, for the mixture of air and water vapor this is the case, the ratio (called psychrometric ratio) being close to 1.

Experiment 2 is what happens in a common wet-bulb thermometer, meaning that its reading is fairly close to the thermodynamic ("real") wet-bulb temperature.

Experimentally, the wet-bulb thermometer reads closest to the thermodynamic wet-bulb temperature if:
The sock is shielded from radiant heat exchange with its surroundings
Air flows past the sock quickly enough to prevent evaporated moisture from affecting evaporation from the sock
The water supplied to the sock is at the same temperature as the thermodynamic wet-bulb temperature of the air

In practice the value reported by a wet-bulb thermometer differs slightly from the thermodynamic wet-bulb temperature because:
The sock is not perfectly shielded from radiant heat exchange
Air flow rate past the sock may be less than optimum
The temperature of the water supplied to the sock is not controlled

At relative humidities below 100 percent, water evaporates from the bulb, cooling it below ambient temperature. To determine relative humidity, ambient temperature is measured using an ordinary thermometer, better known in this context as a dry-bulb thermometer. At any given ambient temperature, less relative humidity results in a greater difference between the dry-bulb and wet-bulb temperatures; the wet-bulb is colder. The precise relative humidity is determined by reading from a  psychrometric chart of wet-bulb versus dry-bulb temperatures, or by calculation.

Psychrometers are instruments with both a wet-bulb and a dry-bulb thermometer.

A wet-bulb thermometer can also be used outdoors in sunlight in combination with a globe thermometer (which measures the incident radiant temperature) to calculate the Wet Bulb Globe Temperature (WBGT).

Adiabatic wet-bulb temperature 
The adiabatic wet-bulb temperature is the temperature a volume of air would have if cooled adiabatically to saturation and then compressed adiabatically to the original pressure in a moist-adiabatic process (AMS Glossary). Such cooling may occur as air pressure reduces with altitude, as noted in the article on lifted condensation level.

This term, as defined in this article, may be most prevalent in meteorology.

As the value referred to as "thermodynamic wet-bulb temperature" is also achieved via an adiabatic process, some engineers and others may use the term "adiabatic wet-bulb temperature" to refer to the "thermodynamic wet-bulb temperature".  As mentioned above, meteorologists and others may use the term "isobaric wet-bulb temperature" to refer to the "thermodynamic wet-bulb temperature".

"The relationship between the isobaric and adiabatic processes is quite obscure. Comparisons indicate, however, that the two temperatures are rarely different by more than a few  tenths of a degree Celsius, and the adiabatic version is always the smaller of the two for unsaturated air. Since the difference is so small, it is usually neglected in practice."

Wet-bulb depression 
The wet-bulb depression is the difference between the dry-bulb temperature and the wet-bulb temperature.  If there is 100% humidity, dry-bulb and wet-bulb temperatures are identical, making the wet-bulb depression equal to zero in such conditions.

Wet-bulb temperature and health 

Living organisms can survive only within a certain temperature range. When the ambient temperature is excessive, many animals cool themselves to below ambient temperature by evaporative cooling (sweat in humans and horses, saliva and water in dogs and other mammals); this helps to prevent potentially fatal hyperthermia due to heat stress. The effectiveness of evaporative cooling depends upon humidity; wet-bulb temperature, or more complex calculated quantities such as wet-bulb globe temperature (WBGT) which also takes account of solar radiation, give a useful indication of the degree of heat stress, and are used by several agencies as the basis for heat stress prevention guidelines.

A sustained wet-bulb temperature exceeding  is likely to be fatal even to fit and healthy people, unclothed in the shade next to a fan; at this temperature human bodies switch from shedding heat to the environment, to gaining heat from it. In practice, such ideal conditions for humans to cool themselves will not always existhence the high fatality levels in the 2003 European  and 2010 Russian heat waves, which saw wet-bulb temperatures no greater than 28 °C.

A 2015 study concluded that depending on the extent of future global warming, parts of the world could become uninhabitable due to deadly wet-bulb temperatures. A 2020 study reported cases where a  wet-bulb temperature had already occurred, albeit too briefly and in too small a locality to cause fatalities.

In 2018, South Carolina implemented new regulations to protect high school students from heat-related emergencies during outdoor activities.

Heat waves with high humidity
The 2015 Indian heat wave saw wet-bulb temperatures in Andhra Pradesh reach . A similar wet-bulb temperature was reached during the 1995 Chicago heat wave.
The government urged residents to stay out of the sun and drink plenty of water.

Highest recorded wet-bulb temperatures

Weather stations are typically at airports, so other locations in the city may have experienced higher values.

Climate change 

Study results indicate that limiting global warming to 1.5 °C would prevent most of the tropics from reaching the wet-bulb temperature of the human physiological limit of 35 °C.

See also 
 Atmospheric thermodynamics
 Dew point
 Heat index
 Wet-bulb conditions
 Wet-bulb potential temperature

References

External links
 3 ways to get wet-bulb temperatures for engineers
 Wet-bulb chart for snow making (Fahrenheit)
 Indirect evaporative cooler cools below wet-bulb
 Wet-bulb and dew-point calculator from NOAA
 Shortcut to calculating wet-bulb
 Heat Stress Index Calculation

Atmospheric thermodynamics
Temperature
Meteorological data and networks

es:Temperatura#Temperatura húmeda